Homu (also Romanized as Homū) is a village in Abish Ahmad Rural District, Abish Ahmad District, Kaleybar County, East Azerbaijan Province, Iran. At the 2006 census, its population was 226, in 38 families.

References 

Populated places in Kaleybar County